Martti Uosikkinen (20 August 1909, in Kuopio – 9 March 1940) was a Finnish gymnast who competed in the 1928 Summer Olympics, in the 1932 Summer Olympics, and in the 1936 Summer Olympics. He was killed in action during World War II.

References

1909 births
1940 deaths
Finnish male artistic gymnasts
Olympic gymnasts of Finland
Gymnasts at the 1928 Summer Olympics
Gymnasts at the 1932 Summer Olympics
Gymnasts at the 1936 Summer Olympics
Olympic bronze medalists for Finland
Olympic medalists in gymnastics
People from Kuopio
Medalists at the 1936 Summer Olympics
Medalists at the 1932 Summer Olympics
Finnish military personnel killed in World War II
Sportspeople from North Savo
20th-century Finnish people